is a Japanese screenwriter, dramatist, director, actor and member of the theater company Otona Keikaku. He won the 'Best Screenplay' award at the 2002 Japanese Academy Awards for Go, which explores problems faced by people of Korean-heritage living in Japan.

He acted in Crying Out Love, In the Center of the World, and is also guitarist in the Japanese Comedy Rock Band Group Tamashii.

Selected filmography

Director
Mayonaka no Yaji-san Kita-san (2005)
Shonen Merikensack (2008)

Writer (Movie Screenplays)
Go (2001)
Ping Pong (2002)
Drugstore Girl (2003)
Iden & Tity (2003)
Kisarazu Cat's Eye: Japan Series (2003)
69 (2004)
Zebraman (2004)
Mayonaka no Yaji-san Kita-san (2005)
Kisarazu Cat's Eye: World Series (2006)
Maiko Haaaan!!! (2007)
Shonen Merikensack (2008)
Zebraman 2: Attack on Zebra City (2010)
Too Young To Die! (2016)

Writer (Television)
 Ikebukuro West Gate Park (2000)
 Rocket Boy (2001)
 Kisarazu Cat's Eye (2002)
 Manhattan Love Story (2003)
 Boku no Mahōtsukai (2003)
 Tiger and Dragon (2005)
 Wagahai wa Shufu de aru (2006)
 Ryūsei no Kizuna (2008)
 Amachan (2013)
 Gomen ne Seishun! (2014)
 Kangoku no Ohimesama (2017)
 Idaten (2019)

Actor
 13 Kaidan (2003)
 Fukumimi (2003)
 Crying Out Love, In the Center of the World (Directed by Yukisada Isao) (2004)
 Kono Mune Ippai no Ai o (Directed by Akihiko Shiota) (2005)
 Memories of Matsuko (Directed by Tetsuya Nakashima) (2006)
 Tekkon Kinkreet [voice] (Directed by Michael Arias) (2006)
 Taitei no Ken (Directed by Yukihiko Tsutsumi) (2007)
 Welcome to the Quiet Room (Directed by Suzuki Matsuo) (2007)
 Mōryō no Hako (Directed by Masato Harada) (2007)
 GeGeGe no Nyōbō (2010)
 Piece of Cake (2015)
 Ora, Ora Be Goin' Alone (2020)
 Because We Forget Everything (2022)
 Ichikei's Crow: The Movie (2023)
 The Dry Spell'' (2023)

References

External links

1970 births
Living people
Japanese male actors
Japanese screenwriters